Gilia clokeyi is a species of flowering plant in the phlox family known by the common name Clokey's gilia. It is native to the south-western United States from California to Colorado, where it grows in desert and other habitat.

The herb produces an erect stem up to 17 centimeters tall often coated in cobwebby fibers on the lower parts and glandular hairs above. The lobed leaves are up to 3 centimeters long and are located in a basal rosette at ground level and also on the lower part of the stem.

The top of the stem branches into an inflorescence bearing tiny flowers on thin pedicels. The flower has a pouchlike calyx of sepals made up of ribs with membranous tissue between. The corolla emerges from the calyx, its narrow tubular throat yellow and white spotted and its face white and blue spotted or streaked.

External links
Jepson Manual Treatment
Photo gallery

clokeyi
Flora of the Southwestern United States
Flora of the California desert regions
North American desert flora
Flora without expected TNC conservation status